The meridian 155° east of Greenwich is a line of longitude that extends from the North Pole across the Arctic Ocean, Asia, the Pacific Ocean, Australasia, the Southern Ocean, and Antarctica to the South Pole.

The 155th meridian east forms a great circle with the 25th meridian west.

From Pole to Pole
Starting at the North Pole and heading south to the South Pole, the 155th meridian east passes through:

{| class="wikitable plainrowheaders"
! scope="col" width="130" | Co-ordinates
! scope="col" | Country, territory or sea
! scope="col" | Notes
|-
| style="background:#b0e0e6;" | 
! scope="row" style="background:#b0e0e6;" | Arctic Ocean
| style="background:#b0e0e6;" |
|-
| style="background:#b0e0e6;" | 
! scope="row" style="background:#b0e0e6;" | East Siberian Sea
| style="background:#b0e0e6;" |
|-valign="top"
| 
! scope="row" | 
| Sakha Republic Magadan Oblast — from 
|-
| style="background:#b0e0e6;" | 
! scope="row" style="background:#b0e0e6;" | Sea of Okhotsk
| style="background:#b0e0e6;" | Shelikhov Gulf
|-
| 
! scope="row" | 
| Magadan Oblast
|-
| style="background:#b0e0e6;" | 
! scope="row" style="background:#b0e0e6;" | Sea of Okhotsk
| style="background:#b0e0e6;" |
|-
| 
! scope="row" | 
| Sakhalin Oblast — Antsiferov Island, Kuril Islands
|-valign="top"
| style="background:#b0e0e6;" | 
! scope="row" style="background:#b0e0e6;" | Pacific Ocean
| style="background:#b0e0e6;" | Passing just east of the island of Onekotan, Sakhalin Oblast,  (at ) Passing just west of the atoll of Oroluk,  (at ) Passing just east of the atoll of Nukuoro,  (at ) Passing just east of the atoll of Kapingamarangi,  (at ) Passing just east of the islands of Nuguria,  (at )
|-valign="top"
| 
! scope="row" | 
| Bougainville Island
|-
| style="background:#b0e0e6;" | 
! scope="row" style="background:#b0e0e6;" | Solomon Sea
| style="background:#b0e0e6;" |
|-valign="top"
| style="background:#b0e0e6;" | 
! scope="row" style="background:#b0e0e6;" | Coral Sea
| style="background:#b0e0e6;" | Passing through the Coral Sea Islands Territory, 
|-
| style="background:#b0e0e6;" | 
! scope="row" style="background:#b0e0e6;" | Pacific Ocean
| style="background:#b0e0e6;" |
|-
| style="background:#b0e0e6;" | 
! scope="row" style="background:#b0e0e6;" | Southern Ocean
| style="background:#b0e0e6;" |
|-
| 
! scope="row" | Antarctica
| Australian Antarctic Territory, claimed by 
|-
|}

See also
154th meridian east
156th meridian east

e155 meridian east